The following is a complete list of first-round draft picks selected by the Ottawa Redblacks of the Canadian Football League. The Redblacks first participated in the Canadian College Draft in 2013 when they were only eligible to select NCAA redshirt juniors. Thereafter, starting with their first season in 2014, they were able to select any draft-eligible player in the CFL draft. The Redblacks have had the first overall selection in the draft once, in 2015.

Player selections

References

 

Draft 1
Ottawa Redblacks